The Extension of University Education Act, Act 45 of 1959, formed part of the apartheid system of racial segregation in South Africa. This act made it a criminal offense for a non-white student to register at a formerly open university without the written permission of the Minister of Internal Affairs. New universities were established for the various non-white groups. The University of the Western Cape was established in Bellville for coloureds, the University of Zululand at Ngoye was created in Zululand for Zulus. The University College for Indians was established at Durban in Natal Province, the University of the North at Turfloop in the Transvaal for the Sotho-Tswanans, while Fort Hare, the former Lovedale Mission College, became "Lovedale College" and restricted to Xhosas.

The act was repealed by the Tertiary Education Act, 1988.

References

Apartheid laws in South Africa
1959 in South African law